St. Luke's Episcopal Church is an historic Episcopal church in Forest Hills, Queens, a neighborhood of New York City.  It was built in three phases that were completed in 1925, 1929, and 1940. The architect was Robert Tappan. The style, described as Collegiate Gothic with Arts and Crafts influences, was chosen to harmonize with surrounding houses in the upscale Forest Hills Gardens development. Tappan was a resident of Forest Hills Gardens and a member of the church, and took no fees for his work. In 1950 a parish house was added, designed by architect Steward Wagner, who was also a resident of the Gardens and a member of the nearby The Church-in-the-Gardens.

The church was listed on the National Register of Historic Places in 2010.

References

External links

St. Lukes Episcopal Church website

Properties of religious function on the National Register of Historic Places in Queens, New York
Collegiate Gothic architecture in New York City
Churches completed in 1925
20th-century Episcopal church buildings
Churches in Queens, New York
Forest Hills, Queens
Gothic Revival church buildings in New York City